Tony Russell "Charles" Brown (September 13, 1922 – January 21, 1999) was an American singer and pianist whose soft-toned, slow-paced nightclub style influenced West Coast blues in the 1940s and 1950s. Between 1949 and 1952, Brown had seven Top 10 hits in the U.S. Billboard R&B chart. His best-selling recordings included "Driftin' Blues" and "Merry Christmas Baby".

Early life
Brown was born in Texas City, Texas. As a child he loved music and received classical music training on the piano. He graduated from Central High School in Galveston, Texas, in 1939 and Prairie View A&M College in 1942 with a degree in chemistry. He then became a chemistry teacher at George Washington Carver High School in Baytown, Texas, a mustard gas worker at the Pine Bluff Arsenal at Pine Bluff, Arkansas, and an apprentice electrician at a shipyard in Richmond, California, before settling in Los Angeles in 1943.

Career

Early success with Johnny Moore
In Los Angeles, an influx of African Americans from the South during World War II created an integrated nightclub scene in which black performers tended to minimize the rougher blues elements of their style. The blues-club style of a light rhythm bass and right-hand tinkling of the piano and smooth vocals became popular, epitomized by the jazz piano of Nat King Cole. When Cole left Los Angeles to perform nationally, his place was taken by Johnny Moore's Three Blazers, featuring Brown's gentle piano and vocals.

The Three Blazers signed with Exclusive Records, and their 1945 recording of "Drifting Blues", with Brown on piano and vocals, stayed on the U.S. Billboard R&B chart for six months, putting Brown at the forefront of a musical evolution that changed American musical performance. Brown led the group in a series of further hits for Aladdin over the next three years, including "New Orleans Blues" and the original version of "Merry Christmas Baby" (both in 1947) and "More Than You Know" (1948). Brown's style dominated the influential Southern California club scene on Central Avenue, in Los Angeles, during that period. He influenced such performers as Floyd Dixon, Cecil Gant, Ivory Joe Hunter, Percy Mayfield, Johnny Ace and Ray Charles.

Solo success
In the late 1940s, a rising demand for blues was driven by a growing audience among white teenagers in the South, which quickly spread north and west. Blues singers such as Louis Jordan, Wynonie Harris and Roy Brown were getting much of the attention, but what writer Charles Keil dubs "the postwar Texas clean-up movement in blues" was also beginning to have an influence, driven by blues artists such as T-Bone Walker, Amos Milburn and Brown. Their singing was lighter and more relaxed, and they worked with bands and combos that had saxophone sections and played from arrangements.

Brown left the Three Blazers in 1948 and formed his own trio with Eddie Williams (bass) and Charles Norris (guitar). He signed with Aladdin Records and had immediate success with "Get Yourself Another Fool" and then had one of his biggest hits, "Trouble Blues", in 1949, which stayed at number one on the Billboard R&B chart for 15 weeks in the summer of that year. He followed with "In the Evening When the Sun Goes Down", "Homesick Blues", and "My Baby's Gone", before having another R&B chart-topping hit with "Black Night", which stayed at number one for 14 weeks from March to June 1951.

His final hit for several years was "Hard Times" in 1951. Brown's approach was too mellow to survive the transition to the harsher rhythms of rock and roll, despite his recording in Cosimo Matassa's New Orleans studio in 1956, and he faded from national attention. Though he was unable to compete with the more aggressive sound that was increasing in popularity, he had a small, devoted audience, and his songs were covered by the likes of John Lee Hooker and Lowell Fulson.

His "Please Come Home for Christmas", a hit for King Records in 1960, remained seasonally popular. "Please Come Home for Christmas" had sold over one million copies by 1968 and was awarded a gold disc in that year.

In the 1960s Brown recorded two albums for Mainstream Records.

Later career
In the 1980s Brown made a series of appearances at the New York City nightclub Tramps. As a result of these appearances he signed a recording contract with Blue Side Records and recorded One More for the Road in three days. Blue Side Records closed soon after, but distribution of its records was picked up by Alligator Records. Soon after the success of One More for the Road, Bonnie Raitt helped usher in a comeback tour for Brown.

He began a recording and performing career again, under the musical direction of the guitarist Danny Caron, to greater success than he had achieved since the 1950s. Other members of Charles's touring ensemble included Clifford Solomon on tenor saxophone, Ruth Davies on bass and Gaylord Birch on drums. Several records received Grammy Award nominations. In the 1980s Brown toured widely as the opening act for Raitt.

Tributes and awards
Brown was inducted into the Blues Hall of Fame in 1996 and was inducted into the Rock and Roll Hall of Fame in 1999. He was a recipient of a 1997 National Heritage Fellowship awarded by the National Endowment for the Arts, which is the highest honor in the folk and traditional arts in the United States.

Brown was nominated for the Grammy Award for Best Traditional Blues Album three times: in 1991 for All My Life, 1992 for Someone To Love and 1995 for Charles Brown's Cool Christmas Blues. Between 1987 and 2005, he was nominated for seventeen Blues Music Awards (formerly known as the W. C. Handy Awards) in multiple categories, with a win in the Blues Instrumentalist: Piano/Keyboard category in 1991, and wins in the Male Blues Vocalist category in 1993 and 1995.

Death
Brown died of congestive heart failure in 1999 in Oakland, California, and was interred at Inglewood Park Cemetery, in Inglewood, California.

Discography
Releases by Brown with Johnny Moore's Three Blazers are located in that discography.

As leader
 Drifting Blues (Score, 1957)
 Sings Christmas Songs (King, 1961)
 The Great Charles Brown That Will Grip Your Heart (King, 1963)
 Boss of the Blues (Mainstream, 1964)
 Ballads My Way (Mainstream, 1965)
 Legend! (Bluesway, 1970)
 Blues 'n' Brown (Jewel, 1972)
 Great Rhythm & Blues Oldies Vol. 2 Charles Brown Blues (Spectrum, 1974)
 Merry Christmas Baby (Big Town, 1977)
 Music, Maestro, Please (Big Town, 1978)
 Please Come Home for Christmas (Gusto, 1978)
 One More for the Road (Blue Side, 1986)
 All My Life (Bullseye Blues, 1990)
 Someone to Love (Bullseye Blues, 1992)
 Blues and Other Love Songs (Muse, 1992)
 These Blues (Gitanes/Verve, 1994)
 Just a Lucky So and So (Bullseye Blues, 1994)
 Charles Brown's Cool Christmas Blues (Bullseye Blues, 1994)
 Live (Charly Blues, 1995)
 Honey Dripper (Gitanes/Verve, 1996)
 So Goes Love (Verve, 1998)
 In a Grand Style (Bullseye Blues, 1999)

Aladdin releases 
3020 "Get Yourself Another Fool" (RR609) b/w "Ooh! Ooh! Sugar" (RR608), 1948, released 1949 (Billboard R&B chart #4)
3021 "A Long Time" (RR617) (Billboard R&B chart #9) b/w "It's Nothing" (RR612), 1949 (Billboard R&B chart #13)
3024 "Trouble Blues" (RR613) b/w "Honey Keep Your Mind on Me" (RR600), 1949 (Billboard R&B chart #1, 15 weeks)
3030 "In the Evening When the Sun Goes Down" (RR611) b/w "Please Be Kind" (RR616), 1949 (Billboard R&B chart #4)
3039 "Homesick Blues" (RR603) b/w "Let's Have a Ball" (RR677), 1949 (billed as Charles Brown & His Smarties) (Billboard R&B chart #5)
3044 "Tormented" (RR673) b/w "Did You Ever Love a Woman" (RR679), 1949, released 1950
3051 "My Baby's Gone" (RR1521) b/w "I Wonder When My Baby's Coming Home" (RR604), 1950 (Billboard R&B chart #6)
3060 "Repentance Blues" (RR1522) b/w "I've Got That Old Feeling" (RR1529), 1950
3066 "I've Made Up My Mind" (RR1528) b/w "Again" (RR1520), 1950
3071 "Texas Blues" (RR1525) b/w "How High the Moon" (RR607), 1950
3076 "Black Night" (RR1619) b/w "Once There Lived a Fool" (RR1623), 1950, released 1951 (Billboard R&B chart #1, 14 weeks)
3091 "I'll Always Be in Love with You" (RR1621) b/w "The Message" (RR1648), 1950, released 1951 (Billboard R&B chart #7)
3092 "Seven Long Days" (RR1620) b/w "Don't Fool with My Heart" (RR1527), 1950, released 1951 (Billboard R&B chart #2)
3116 "Hard Times" (RR1752) b/w "Tender Heart" (RR1750), 1951, released 1952 (Billboard R&B chart #7)
3120 "Still Water" (RR1751) b/w "My Last Affair" (RR602), 1951, released 1952
3138 "Gee" (RR1523) b/w "Without Your Love (RR1531), 1950, released 1952
3157 "Rollin' Like a Pebble in the Sand" (RR2018) b/w "Alley Batting" (RR674), 1952
3163 "Evening Shadows" (RR2017) b/w "Moonrise" (RR1650), 1952
3176 "Rising Sun" (RR2019) b/w "Take Me" (RR676), 1952, released 1953
3191 "I Lost Everything" (UN2125) b/w "Lonesome Feeling" (UN2127), 1953
3200 "Don't Leave Poor Me" (UN2126) b/w "All My Life" (RR1649), not released
3209 "Cryin' and Driftin' Blues" (RR2212) b/w "P.S. I Love You" (RR2215), 1953 (billed as Charles Brown with Johnny Moore's Three Blazers)
3220 "Everybody's Got Troubles (RR2254) b/w "I Want to Fool Around with You" (RR2257), 1953, released 1954 (billed as Charles Brown with Johnny Moore's Three Blazers)
3235 "Let's Walk" (RR2253) b/w "Cryin' Mercy" (RR2214), 1953, released 1954 (billed as Charles Brown with Johnny Moore's Three Blazers)
3235 "Let's Walk" (RR2253) b/w "Blazer's Boogie" (111B) (re-release) 1953, released 1954 (billed as Charles Brown with Johnny Moore's Three Blazers)
3254 "My Silent Love (RR2255) b/w "Foolish" (RR601), 1953, released 1954 (billed as Charles Brown with Johnny Moore's Three Blazers)
3272 "Honey Sipper" (RR2328) b/w "By the Bend of the River" (RR2329), 1954
3284 "Nite After Nite" (RR2331) b/w "Walk with Me" (RR2332), 1954, released 1955
3290 "Fool's Paradise" (CAP2486) b/w "Hot Lips and Seven Kisses (Mambo)" (CAP2484), 1955 (billed as Charles Brown with Ernie Freeman's Combo)
3296 "My Heart Is Mended" (CAP2483) b/w "Trees, Trees" (CAP2487), 1955 (billed as Charles Brown with Ernie Freeman's Combo)
3316 "Please Don't Drive Me Away" (CAP2489) b/w "One Minute to One" (CAP2488), 1955, released 1956 (billed as Charles Brown with Ernie Freeman's Combo)
3339 "I'll Always Be in Love with You" (NO2725) (re-recording) b/w "Soothe Me" (NO2726), 1956 
3342 "Confidential" (NO2754) b/w "Trouble Blues" (reissue), 1956
3348 "Merry Christmas Baby" (NO2730) (re-recording) b/w "Black Night" (reissue), 1956 
3348 "Black Night" (reissue) b/w "Ooh! Ooh! Sugar" (reissue), 1957 (post-Christmas re-release)
3366 "It's a Sin to Tell a Lie" (NO2727) b/w "Please Believe Me" (NO2728), 1956, released 1957
3422 "Hard Times" (reissue) b/w "Ooh! Ooh! Sugar" (reissue), 1958

Imperial releases 
5830 "Fool's Paradise" (reissue) b/w "Lonesome Feeling" (reissue), 1962
5902 "Merry Christmas Baby" (reissue) b/w "I Lost Everything" (reissue), 1962
5905 "Drifting Blues" (reissue) b/w "Black Night" (reissue), 1963
5961 "Please Don't Drive Me Away" (reissue) b/w "I'm Savin' My Love for You" (RR2330), 1963

East West (Atlantic subsidiary) release 
106 "When Did You Leave Heaven" (EW-2753) b/w "We've Got a Lot in Common" (EW-2755), 1957, released 1958

Ace releases 
561 "I Want to Go Home" (with Amos Milburn) (S-253) b/w "Educated Fool" (with Amos Milburn) (S-254), 1959
599 "Sing My Blues Tonight" (S-843) b/w "Love's Like a River" (S-844), 1960

Teem (Ace subsidiary) release 
1008 "Merry Christmas Baby" (A-1113-63) b/w "Christmas Finds Me Oh So Sad (Please Come Home for Christmas)" (A-1114-63), 1961, released 1963

King releases 
5405 Charles Brown, "Please Come Home for Christmas" (K4912) b/w Amos Milburn, "Christmas Comes but Once a Year" (K4913), 1960
5439 "Baby Oh Baby" (K4992) b/w "Angel Baby" (K4993), 1961
5464 "I Wanna Go Back Home" (with Amos Milburn) (K10607) b/w "My Little Baby" (with Amos Milburn) (K10608), 1961
5523 "This Fool Has Learned" (K10892) b/w "Butterfly" (K10893), 1961
5530 "It's Christmas All Year Round" (K10897) b/w "Christmas in Heaven" (K10947), 1961
5570 "Without a Friend" (K10983) b/w "If You Play with Cats" (K10984), 1961
5722 "I'm Just a Drifter" (K11405) b/w "I Don't Want Your Rambling Letters" (K11406), 1963
5726 "It's Christmas Time" (K10898) b/w "Christmas Finds Me Lonely Wanting You" (K10950), 1961, released 1963
5731 "Christmas Questions" (K10954) b/w "Wrap Yourself in a Christmas Package" (K10956), 1961, released 1963
5802 "If You Don't Believe I'm Crying (Take a Look at My Eyes)" (K11687) b/w "I Wanna Be Close" (K11689), 1964
5825 "Lucky Dreamer" (K11688) b/w "Too Fine for Crying" (K11690), 1964
5852 "Come Home" (K11691) b/w "Blow Out All the Candles (Happy Birthday to You)" (K11692), 1964
5946 "Christmas Blues" (K10948) b/w "My Most Miserable Christmas" (K10955), 1961, released 1964
5947 "Christmas Comes but Once a Year" (K10951) b/w "Bringing In a Brand New Year" (K10949), 1961, released 1964

Mainstream release 
607 "Pledging My Love" b/w "Tomorrow Night", 1965

Ace release 
775 "Please Come Home for Christmas" (92772-A) (reissue) b/w "Merry Christmas Baby" (92772-1B) (reissue), 1966

King releases 
6094 "Regardless" (K12330) b/w "The Plan" (K12331), 1967
6192 "Hang On a Little Longer" (K12723) b/w "Black Night" (K12724) (re-recording), 1968
6194 "Merry Christmas Baby" (K12725) (re-recording) b/w "Let's Make Every Day a Christmas Day" (K10946), 1968
6420 "For the Good Times" (K14276) b/w "Lonesome and Driftin'" (K14277), 1973

References

External links
[ Biography on Allmusic]

1922 births
1999 deaths
People from Texas City, Texas
American blues pianists
American male pianists
American blues singers
National Heritage Fellowship winners
King Records artists
Imperial Records artists
Muse Records artists
Modern Records artists
Kent Records artists
Jewel Records artists
Ace Records (United States) artists
ABC Records artists
Burials at Inglewood Park Cemetery
Urban blues musicians
West Coast blues musicians
People from Galveston, Texas
Singers from Texas
Prairie View A&M University alumni
20th-century African-American male singers
20th-century American singers
20th-century American pianists
20th-century American male singers
Aladdin Records artists
African-American pianists
The New York Rock and Soul Revue members